CHIC-FM, is a Canadian radio station, which broadcasts Christian radio on 88.7 MHz (FM) in Rouyn-Noranda, Quebec.

History
On March 5, 2001, the CRTC approved an application by André Curadeau, on behalf of a company to be incorporated, for a new French-language specialty FM radio station at Rouyn-Noranda. The station began broadcasting in 2002.

Notes

CHIC-FM was also the original call sign of a radio station in Toronto known as CFNY-FM.

Previous logos

References

External links
 CHIC-FM
 
 

Hic
Hic
Hic
Radio stations established in 2002
2002 establishments in Quebec